Danielle Amanda George  (née Kettle; born 27 January 1976) is a Professor of Radio frequency engineering in the Department of Electrical and Electronic Engineering (EEE) and Associate Dean for Teaching and Learning at the University of Manchester in the UK. George became the 139th President of the Institution of Engineering and Technology in October 2020.

Education
George was born to a car mechanic father and a mother who taught children with special needs, and is the middle of three sisters. She grew up in Newcastle upon Tyne and was educated at Kenton School and the University of Liverpool where she completed her Bachelor of Science degree in Astrophysics.

After her Master of Science degree in the School of Physics and Astronomy, University of Manchester, she worked at Jodrell Bank Observatory (JBO), as a radio frequency engineer. Alongside her engineering work, she completed a PhD degree at the University of Manchester Institute of Science and Technology (UMIST) for research on low-noise amplifiers.

Career and research
George worked at JBO as a senior microwave engineer until 2006, when she was appointed a lecturer in the School of Electrical and Electronic Engineering. She was promoted to Professor at the age of 38 in 2014. She served as editor of the International Journal of Electrical Engineering Education (IJEEE) 2013 to 2014. George's research and development investigates low noise receivers and particularly:

 Microwave and millimetre wave monolithic microwave integrated circuit (MMIC) design
 Millimetre-wave radiometer development and characterisation
 Low noise high-electron-mobility transistor (HEMT) parameter extraction and modelling
 Cryogenic low-noise amplifier (LNA) and radiometer applications
 Engine communications using radio frequency / microwave techniques
 Improvements to focal-plane arrays 
 Identification of weeds in horticulture crops using radio frequency (RF) techniques

George is the UK lead for amplifiers in the Square Kilometre Array (SKA), the Atacama Large Millimeter Array (ALMA) telescope and has worked with NASA and the European Space Agency on the development of instrumentation for researchers exploring the Big Bang.

George's research has been funded by the Science and Technology Facilities Council (STFC) and the Department for Environment, Food and Rural Affairs (DEFRA). She is co-founder of the Manchester Recycled Robot Orchestra.

In 2017, she and Christophe Galfard (a former Ph.D. student of Stephen Hawking), presented The Search for a New Earth on BBC 2, exploring how and if humans could reach for the stars and then relocate to different planets. It had clips of Prof. Stephen Hawking talking about his various theories. "We can, and must, use our curiosity and intelligence to look to the stars".

Awards and honours
George gave the 2014 Royal Institution Christmas Lectures on how to hack your home. At the time of the lectures, George was the sixth woman since 1825 to present the Christmas lectures, following Susan Greenfield (1994), Nancy Rothwell (1998), Monica Grady (2003), Sue Hartley (2009) and Alison Woollard (2013). The lectures included a live conversation with Samantha Cristoforetti on the International Space Station and turning the Shell Centre in London into a giant game of tetris. In 2016 the Royal Academy of Engineering awarded her the Rooke Award for public promotion of engineering.

George was appointed Member of the Order of the British Empire (MBE) in the 2016 Birthday Honours for services to engineering through public engagement. George was awarded the Michael Faraday Prize by the Royal Society in 2018. She is also a Fellow of the Institution of Engineering and Technology (FIET).

References

Living people
1976 births
Academics of the University of Manchester
Alumni of the University of Liverpool
Scientists from Newcastle upon Tyne
Fellows of the Institution of Engineering and Technology
Members of the Order of the British Empire
English electrical engineers
Presidents of the Association for Science Education